Norddalsfjord Bridge is a cantilever bridge that crosses the Norddalsfjorden in the municipality of Kinn in Vestland county, Norway. It is the only road (non-ferry) that connects Bremanger municipality to the rest of the mainland. The bridge was opened in 1987.

See also
List of bridges in Norway
List of bridges in Norway by length
List of bridges
List of bridges by length

References

Kinn
Bridges in Vestland
Bridges completed in 1987
1987 establishments in Norway